Scanzano may refer to:

 Scanzano Jonico, town and comune in the province of Matera, in the Southern Italian region of Basilicata.
 Scanzano, Sante Marie, a frazione of Sante Marie, in the Province of L'Aquila in the Abruzzo, region of Italy

See also 

 Scansano